Stavros  is a village on the island of Othonoi, Greece. It takes its name from the Cross monument, located at an altitude of 217 meters, that commemorates the massacre of the inhabitants of the island by the Ottoman fleet under Hayreddin Barbarossa in 1537 when Diapontia islands and Corfu were parts of  Republic of Venice.

References

Populated places in Corfu (regional unit)
Othonoi